Mulberry is an unincorporated community in northwestern Fannin County, Texas, United States.

External links
 MULBERRY, TX Handbook of Texas Online.
 www.mulberrytx.com 

Unincorporated communities in Fannin County, Texas
Unincorporated communities in Texas